Poland Plus was a centre-right political party in Poland that existed briefly during 2010.  It was formed on 9 January 2010 from deputies in the Sejm that crossed the floor from the Law and Justice party.

The party was dissolved on 24 September 2010, with five of its parliamentary representatives, including leader Jerzy Polaczek, returning to Law and Justice, while Jan Filip Libicki and Jacek Tomczak sat as independents.  In November 2010, four of the former Poland Plus members – Libicki, Tomczak, Lucjan Karasiewicz, and Andrzej Walkowiak – joined Poland Comes First.

Members of Sejm
Poland Plus had seven representatives:

 Lucjan Karasiewicz
 Jan Filip Libicki
 Jerzy Polaczek (leader)
 Jarosław Sellin
 Jacek Tomczak
 Kazimierz Michał Ujazdowski
 Andrzej Walkowiak

External links
 Polska Plus official website

2010 disestablishments in Poland
2010 establishments in Poland
Defunct political parties in Poland
Law and Justice
Liberal conservative parties in Poland
Political parties disestablished in 2010
Political parties established in 2010